The Carey Block—located at 602 Greybull Ave. in Greybull, Wyoming—is a building that was built in 1916.  It has also been known as Hurst Block, First State Bank, and Greybull Hotel .

It was listed on the National Register of Historic Places in 2009.

It was built by Gagnon & Co. in Early Commercial style.

References

Commercial buildings on the National Register of Historic Places in Wyoming
Early Commercial architecture in the United States
Buildings and structures completed in 1916
Big Horn County, Wyoming